Johann Wieland (born 1 January 1972) is an Austrian ski mountaineer.

Wieland started ski mountaineering in 1984 and competed first in the Preberlauf event in 1999. He has been member of the ASKIMO national team since 2008 and lives in Tamsweg.

Selected results 
 2004:
 1st, Preberlauf
 1st, Mountain Attack tour
 7th and Austrian record, Patrouille des Glaciers "seniors II" class ranking (together with Hermann Kofler and Rolf Majcen)
 2005:
 1st, Preberlauf
 1st, Mountain Attack tour
 2006:
 1st, Preberlauf
 1st, Mountain Attack tour
 2007:
 1st and course record, Preberlauf
 4th, Mountain Attack marathon
 2008:
 1st, Rofan Xtreme team (together with Andreas Ringhofer and Andreas Fischbacher)
 1st, Preberlauf
 3rd, Austrian Championship
 8th, World Championship combination ranking
 2009:
 4th, European Championship relay race (together with Wolfgang Klocker, Martin Bader and Alexander Fasser)
 10th, European Championship combination ranking
 2010:
 2nd, Mountain Attack race

References

External links 
 Johann Wieland at skimountaineering.org

1972 births
Living people
Austrian male ski mountaineers